Domenico Messina (born 12 August 1962 in Cava de' Tirreni, Salerno, Italy) is an Italian football referee. He has refereed in the Serie A since 1995; his first match was played between Genoa and Padova on 15 January. Since then, he has refereed almost 200 matches in the Serie A.

In 1998, Messina was granted the right to referee international matches, and he joined UEFA's elite panel of referees in 2001, before he was replaced on the panel by fellow Italian Stefano Farina in 2005. He made his refereeing debut in the UEFA Champions League in 2001, refereeing a match between Paris Saint-Germain and Bayern Munich. Messina has also refereed two Coppa Italia finals; first in 1999 between Parma and Fiorentina, and then the 2006 final between Internazionale and Roma.

At international level, Messina served as a FIFA referee in qualifiers for the 2002 and 2006 World Cups, as well as preliminary matches for Euro 2000, Euro 2004, and Euro 2008.

In the summer of 2006, Messina was involved in the Calciopoli scandal, giving evidence on behalf of the Italian Football Federation. In July 2007, Messina announced his intention to retire from professional refereeing at the end of the 2007–08 season, by which time he will have reached the age of 45, the FIFA-specified age that referees must retire from top-level refereeing.

References

1962 births
Living people
Sportspeople from the Province of Salerno
Italian football referees